The Autostrada A34 is an Italian motorway that branches off of the A4 motorway at the Villesse junction going towards Gorizia. The motorway ends after 17 kilometers in Sant'Andrea / Vertoiba, where it continues as the H4 expressway in Slovenia. The highway is managed by Autovie Venete.

Previously, before the redevelopment, the highway was classified as a junction (RA 17), but was granted the new classification as A34 by the Ministry of Transport.

The entire highway requires the use of winter equipment from 15 November to 15 April.

History 

The original junction was opened in the late 1970s. Since the end of 2005, the road has been managed by Autovie Venete.

Redevelopment 
The original RA 17 junction was classified as a secondary extra-urban road, defined by Italian regulations as being a single highway road with at least one lane in each direction. The road was later upgraded to meet highway regulations, starting on 12 December 2009. The redevelopment was estimated to cost €172,000,000 and was done by a temporary association of companies: I.CO.P. SpA of Paolo Petrucco, Friulana Bitumi, SIOSS, Valle Costruzioni, and Tomat. To bring up to highway regulations, the junction had to be widened from 14 meters (45.93 ft.) to 25 meters (82.02 ft.), adding two more lanes of travel plus an emergency lane. Two artificial tunnels were built, along with a railway underpass, bridges, and viaducts. With Order 97/13, Autovie Venete opened the junction as a highway on 15 October 2013.

Features

Original road 

Since the road was not originally classified as a highway and instead as a secondary extra-urban road, the road was toll free. It had four lanes, two in each direction without an emergency lane.

The two sides were first separated simply by a double solid line, but in 2007 a Jersey barrier made of concrete was added in its place.

The RA 17 junction did not appear on any road signs. In fact, on signs located on overpasses, the junction was referred to as "a Villesse-Gorizia connection".

From 2013 
The work on the road was done to bring it up to regulations defined by Ministerial Decree 6792 of 2001 for Type A roads, which were motorways outside of the city. This allowed to increase the maximum speed on the road to 130 km/h (approximately 80 mph) from the original 80 km/h (approximately 50 mph).

Route table

References

Notes

External links

Highways in Italy
A34
Transport in Friuli-Venezia Giulia